The 2022 Central Pulse season saw the Central Pulse netball team compete in the 2022 ANZ Premiership.  With a team coached by Yvette McCausland-Durie, co-captained by Kelly Jury and Tiana Metuarau and featuring Aliyah Dunn, Erikana Pedersen and Whitney Souness, Central Pulse won their third title. Pulse finished the regular season as minor premiers, finishing above Northern Stars and Northern Mystics. Pulse defeated Stars 56–37 in the Grand final.

Players

Player movements

Notes
   Temalisi Fakahokotau initially signed for Central Pulse but in January 2022 announced she would be taking a break from netball. However she subsequently joined Saracens Mavericks as a replacement player for the 2022 Netball Superleague season.

2022 roster

Impact of COVID-19 pandemic
Just like the 2020 season, the 2022 season was impacted by the COVID-19 pandemic. Central Pulse were due to host the sixth edition of the official ANZ Premiership tournament at Te Wānanga o Raukawa in Otaki between 24 and 27 February. However, the tournament was cancelled after a change in COVID-19 alert levels. Pulse's Round 1 match against Northern Stars was cancelled following a COVID-19 outbreak in their squad. Their head coach Yvette McCausland-Durie also tested positive for COVID-19.

Regular season

Fixtures and results
Round 1

Round 2

 
Round 3

Round 4

Round 5

Round 6

Round 7

Round 8

Round 9

Round 10 

Round 11

Round 12

Round 13

Notes
  Matches postponed under the ANZ Premiership's COVID-19 Match Postponement Policy.

Final standings

Finals Series

Grand final

National Netball League
With a team featuring Renee Matoe, Parris Mason and Amelia Walmsley, Pulse's reserve team, Central Manawa, won the 2022 National Netball League title after defeating Mainland 49–41 in the grand final.

Awards

New Zealand Netball Awards

Notes
  Kelly Jury shared the Dame Lois Muir Supreme Award with Grace Nweke (Northern Mystics).

ANZ Premiership Awards

Team of the season
Four Central Pulse players were included in Brendon Egan's Stuff's team of the season.

Stuff Super Seven 

Bench

References

2022
2022 ANZ Premiership season
2022 in New Zealand netball